Blue Ridge Shores is a census-designated place (CDP) in Louisa County, Virginia, United States. The population as of the 2010 census was 813. It was built beginning in 1960 as a resort community around Lake Louisa.

Geography
Blue Ridge Shores is in northern Louisa County, in the Piedmont region of Virginia.

Lake Louisa, a reservoir built on Hickory Creek, is in the center of the community. Hickory Creek flows northeast to the North Anna River and is part of the Pamunkey River watershed, leading to the tidal York River and Chesapeake Bay.

History 
A history of the community can be found at the Blue Ridge Shores community website.

References

External links
 Blue Ridge Shores community website

Census-designated places in Louisa County, Virginia
Census-designated places in Virginia
Populated places established in 1960